Chadalavada (Telugu: చదలవాడ) is an Indian surname. Notable people with the surname include:

 Chadalawada Krishnamurthy, member of Andhra Pradesh Legislative Assembly
 Chadalavada (actor) (died 1968), comedian in Telugu films

Indian surnames